Goteriala, which is also spelled Goteriala and Gotriyala, is a village in Kharian Tehsil, Gujrat district in Pakistan

Geography 

Goteriala is situated near the border with Azad Kashmir and Punjab, Pakistan, approximately 25 kilometers from Kharian and 50 kilometers from Gujrat. The Union Council of Goteriala is Thutha Rai Bahadar, which is 6 kilometres away to the south. The border with Azad Kashmir also lies 1.5 kilometers north of the village.

Goteriala is situated in a mountainous area and a stream, "Nala Bhimber", flows through the valley. The village hosts several graveyards, including "Hafiz Siddique Graveyard" and "Zinda peer".

The village has approximately 1500 to 2000 houses housing a population of approximately 5000. The central mosque of Goteriala is Jamia Masjid.

History 

The village was founded in 1638. Its name is derived from the Punjabi phrase for old man, "baba Goto". The majority of the inhabitants are Jatt. 

During the 20th century, the majority of men from Goteriala served in the Pakistan Army.

Economy 
The land surrounding the village is arid, so production of crops is completely dependent on seasonal rainfall. As a result, agriculture has not been the main source of income for the local population. Many of the villagers have gone overseas to find work and have set up businesses in Italy, Spain, the United States, the United Kingdom, Saudi Arabia and the United Arab Emirates

Infrastructure 
Electricity was introduced in 1983, and Land line telephony was introduced in 2006. One water turbine supplies fresh water, the result of a project of the World Health Organization, but they have not worked for 14 to 15 years. Many shops operate in Goteriala, mostly in the Goteriala Bazaar. Streets are paved and sewage ditches are open, but lined.

Climate 
The climate of this region is extreme. Winters can be extremely cold, which creates problems given the unreliable electricity supply.

Education 
Goteriala has had a primary school since 1905. Separate government high schools are available for boys and girls. Private schools are also available, including a girl's religious school (deobandi madrasa).

Populated places in Gujrat District
Villages in Gujrat District